The Elon Phoenix men's basketball team is the basketball team that represents Elon University in Elon, North Carolina, United States. The school completed an 11-season tenure in the Southern Conference in 2013–14; it moved to the Colonial Athletic Association on July 1, 2014.

History

Conference affiliations
North State Conference
Carolinas Conference
South Atlantic Conference
Big South Conference
Southern Conference
Colonial Athletic Association

School records

Season
Most victories
25 (1951-52, 1952-53, 1955-56)
Longest winning streak
14 (1939-1940)
Highest scoring average
84.3 (1955-56)
Field-goal percentage
50.0 (1968-69, 1977-78)
Rebounds
1,528 (1955-56)
Rebounding average
47.8 (1955-56)

Game
Points allowed
4 vs. Atlantic Christian (1925)
Field-goals made
44 vs. Guilford (1956) and vs. DuPont (1957)
Field-goals attempted
85 vs. Guilford (1949)
Field-goals percentage
68.9 vs. Guilford (1961)
Free throws
52 vs. North Carolina A&T (1969)
Free throws attempted
55 vs. North Carolina A&T (1969)

Championships
Division
2013 (SoCon North)
Conference
1932, 1934, 1935, 1937, 1938, 1941, 1952, 1971, 1974, 1975, 1976, 1977
Conference tournament
1947, 1956, 1965, 1971, 1972, 1997
State
1914, 1915, 1921
District
1956, 1957

On February 9, 2009, Elon retired its first basketball jerseys, honoring All-Americans Jesse Branson ('65) and Tommy Cole ('72).

Head coaches

Postseason

NCAA Division II tournament results
The Phoenix have appeared in the NCAA Division II tournament one time. Their record is 0–1.

CIT results
The Phoenix have appeared in one CollegeInsider.com Postseason Tournament (CIT). Their record is 0–1.

NAIA tournament results
The Phoenix have appeared in the NAIA tournament three times. Their combined record is 0–3.

References

External links